Escrennes is a commune in the Loiret department in north-central France. As of 2018, its population was 744.

See also
Communes of the Loiret department

References

Communes of Loiret